Owambarctia unipuncta is a moth of the family Erebidae. It was described by Sergius G. Kiriakoff in 1973. It is found in Tanzania.

References

Endemic fauna of Tanzania
Syntomini
Moths described in 1973